The 2005 Black Reel Awards, which annually recognize and celebrate the achievements of black people in feature, independent and television films, took place in Washington, D.C. on February 19, 2005. Ray and Redemption: The Stan Tookie Williams Story were the big winners during the ceremony, picking up five awards each.

Winners and nominees
Winners are listed first and highlighted in bold.

References

2005 in American cinema
2005 awards in the United States
Black Reel Awards
2004 film awards